In team sports, substitution (or interchange) is replacing one player with another during a match.  Substitute players that are not in the starting lineup (also known as bench players, backups, interchange, or reserves) reside on the bench and are available to substitute for a starter. Later in the match, that substitute may be substituted for by another substitute or by a starter who is currently on the bench.

Some sports have restrictions on substituting or interchanging players whereas others do not. Futsal, handball, ice hockey and lacrosse are examples of sports which allow an unlimited number of substitutions at any time during the game, subject to certain rules. American football, basketball, and water polo are examples of sports that allow unlimited substitutions during stoppages of play, but not during live play. Association football, baseball, and rugby are examples of sports where teams are only permitted a limited number of substitutions during a game.

In motorsports, a substitution behind the wheel goes by the term "relief driver."

See also

 Interchange (Australian rules football)
 Interchange (rugby league)
 Substitute (football)
 Substitute (cricket)
 Basketball#Playing regulations 
 Baseball rules#Substitutions

Sports terminology